The 2011 FIBA Europe SuperCup Women was the third edition of the FIBA Europe SuperCup Women. It was held on 5 October 2011 at the Pabellón de Wurzburg in Salamanca, Spain.

Time
Times are CET (UTC+1).

Final

References

External links
 SuperCup Women

2011
2011–12 in European women's basketball
2011–12 in Spanish women's basketball
2011–12 in Israeli basketball
International women's basketball competitions hosted by Spain
Sport in Salamanca